General Owen may refer to:

David Lloyd Owen (1917–2001), British Army major general
John Owen (Royal Marines officer) (1777–1857), Royal Marines lieutenant general
Joshua T. Owen (1822–1887), Union Army brigadier general

See also
General Owens (disambiguation)